Caoba may refer to:

 Burger, a wine grape
 Caoba Township (lit. "Grass Dam Village") in Li County, Gansu, in China.
 Mahogany wood